The 1994 Lakeside ATCC round was the fifth round of the 1994 Australian Touring Car Championship. It was held on the weekend of 22 to 24 April at Lakeside International Raceway in Brisbane, Queensland. The Peter Jackson Dash was discontinued for this round.

Race results

Qualifying 
Peter Brock took his first pole position of the year and the second for the Holden Racing Team. Just one-tenth behind was John Bowe and two-tenths behind was team-mate, Tomas Mezera.

Race 1 
A dramatic start to the first race saw Dick Johnson beating Glenn Seton off the start and a tangle between Brock and Longhurst, which subsequently led to their retirements from the race. With Longhurst blocking the circuit, the race was restarted. On the restart, Seton beat Johnson off the start, only to be passed by Johnson several laps later. As Seton started to struggle with tyres, a train of Bowe, Jones, and Perkins caught up with him. After trying to pass Seton down the bottom of the hill into the last corner, Bowe tagged the back of Seton, sending him into a spin. Bowe subsequently incurred damage, leading to a flat tyre. As he limped around the circuit, he was hit by Tomas Mezera on turn four. This catapulted Mezera into the guardrail, taking him out of the race and causing extensive damage to both cars. Up the front, it was a clean performance from Dick Johnson as he took his first race win of the season, with Perkins second and Jim Richards in third.

Race 2 
After bogging down at the start, Johnson wasted his front row start and found himself in fourth by the end of the first lap. After a couple of laps, Johnson began to climb back up the order and began to chase down race leader, Perkins. Toward the middle of the race, Neil Schembri blew his engine, laying down a trail of oil down the hill into the final corner. The smoke plume left meant that some of the leading drivers couldn't see the oil. The first driver to spin out was Dick Johnson, followed by Alan Jones, and finally Wayne Gardner. Toward the end of the race, Jim Richards began to rapidly close in on the back of Perkins. Though it proved not be enough. Perkins took the win, with Richards in second and Brock in third after a storming drive from the back of the grid.

Championship Standings 

Drivers' Championship standings

References

External links 

Lakeside